Music for a First Love is the eighth studio album by American jazz singer Dinah Washington released in 1957 via Mercury label. The tracks were recorded in various sessions between January 1946 and September 1950.

Track listing

Personnel
 Dinah Washington – vocals
 Willie Cook (1), Harry "Pee Wee" Jackson (1, 3), George Hudson (6, 12), Bob Merrill (9), Cootie Williams (9) - trumpet
 Gus Chappell (1), Benny Powell (possibly 11) - trombone
 Andrew Gardner (3) Rupert Cole (6, possibly 9, 12), Ernie Wilkins (6, 11-12) - alto sax
 Dave Young (possibly 1; 3), William Parker (9) - tenor sax
 Cecil Payne (6, 11-12) - baritone sax 
 Tony Aless (2), Rudy Martin (possibly 1; 3-4), James Forman (6, 12), Arnold Jarvis (9) - piano
 Billy Bauer (2), Hurley Ramey (possibly 4), Freddie Green (6, 11-12), Mundell Lowe (9) - guitar
 Chubby Jackson (2), Bill Settles (possibly 1; 3-4), Ray Brown (6, 11-12), Leonard Swain (9) - bass
 Oliver Coleman (1), Curtis Walker (3), Teddy Stewart (6, 8, 10-12), Sylvester "Vess" Payne (9) - drums
 Jimmy Carroll, conductor (5, 7)

References

Dinah Washington albums
1957 albums
Mercury Records albums